is a Japanese football player. He plays for FC Kariya.

Club statistics

References

External links

1989 births
Living people
Association football people from Aichi Prefecture
Japanese footballers
J2 League players
Japan Football League players
Yokohama FC players
Fagiano Okayama players
Verspah Oita players
FC Kariya players
Association football forwards